Praedatophasma is a genus of insects in the family Mantophasmatidae. It is a monotypic genus consisting of the species Praedatophasma maraisi, which is endemic to southern Namibia.

References

Mantophasmatidae
Monotypic insect genera
Insects of Namibia
Endemic fauna of Namibia